Three ships of the United States Navy have been named USS Koka:

  was a twin-screw monitor, launched in 1865, which never entered into active service and was scrapped in 1874.
  was a tugboat in service from 1920 until 1938.
  a tugboat launched in 1944.

United States Navy ship names